KMHS (1420 AM) is a high school radio station broadcasting a classic country music format. Licensed to Coos Bay, Oregon, United States, the station is currently owned by Coos Bay Public Schools. The station broadcasts from studios at Marshfield High School.

History
The station went on the air as KYNG on 1992-02-18.  On 1992-03-09, the station changed its call sign to KRSR, on 1997-08-04 to the current KMHS.

References

External links
FCC History Cards for KMHS 

MHS
Coos Bay, Oregon
High school radio stations in the United States
1992 establishments in Oregon